Dash For Cash (April 17, 1973May 20, 1996) was an American Quarter Horse racehorse and  an influential sire in the Quarter Horse breed.

Racing career
Dash For Cash won $507,688 during his career and was the Racing World Champion in 1976 and 1977.

Dash For Cash victories came in the Champion of Champions (1976, 1977),  Sun Country Futurity, Los Alamitos Invitational Champ, Los Alamitos Derby, Vessels Maturity, and the Lubbock Downs Futurity.

In May 1996, Dash for Cash developed complications from equine protozoal myeloencephalitis and was euthanized.

Dash For Cash was inducted into the AQHA Hall of Fame in 1997.

Pedigree

Notes

References
 All Breed Pedigree Pedigree of Dash For Cash retrieved on 22 June 2007
 Pitzer, Andrea Laycock The Most Influential Quarter Horse Sires Tacoma, WA:Premier Pedigrees 1987

Further reading
 Biasatti, Helena "Dash For Cash Wins 1977 Champion of Champions Invitational" Quarter Horse Journal February 1978
 Chamberlain, Richard "Inside the Syndicate" Quarter Horse Journal" July 1996 p. 49
 Chamberlain, Richard "The Big Red One: In Quarter Horse Racing, Dash For Cash was No. 1" Quarter Horse Journal July 1996 p. 76-79
 "Dash For Cash Syndicated for $2.5 Million" Quarter Horse Journal October 1977
 Owens, Amy "A Final Chapter: Dash For Cash's Last Crop Heads to the Track" Quarter Horse Journal'' April 1998

1973 racehorse births
1996 racehorse deaths
American Quarter Horse racehorses
Racehorses bred in the United States
Racehorses trained in the United States
American Quarter Horse sires
Thoroughbred family 2-s
AQHA Hall of Fame (horses)